Arina is a feminine given name.

Origins

As a Slavic name, Арина, it is a variant of Irina, meaning peace. 

It is also a Japanese name meaning Gold and a Kurdish/Persian name meaning Prince of Persia.

In history, Arina is Greek in origin and it means ‘Peace’. 
In Greek mythology, it was the name of the Greek goddess of peace.

People with this given name
Arina Averina (born 1998), Russian rhythmic gymnast
Arina Bilotserkivska (born 1989), Ukrainian basketballer
Arina Charopa (born 1995), Belarusian rhythmic gymnast
Arina Cherniavskaia (born 1998), Russian pair skater
Arina Ephipania (born 1978), Indonesian vocalist
Arina Folts (born 1997), Uzbekistani tennis player
Arina Hugenholtz (1848–1934), Dutch painter
Arina Kachan (born 1994), Belarusian judoka
Arina Martinova (born 1990), Russian figure skater
Arina Openysheva (born 1999), Russian competitive swimmer
Arina Rodionova (born 1989), Russian tennis player 
Arina Sharapova (born 1961), Russian TV presenter and journalist
Arina Shulgina (born 1991), Russian triathlete
Arina Sobakina (1762–?), Russian ballerina and stage actress
Arina Surkova (born 1998), Russian swimmer
Arina Tanemura (born 1978), Japanese manga artist
Arina Tsitsilina (born 1998), Belarusian rhythmic gymnast
Arina Ushakova (born 1989), Russian pair skater and coach
Arina Ushakova (born 2002), Russian ice dancer
Arina Bulanova (born 1999), Russian musical artist 

 Slavic feminine given names
 Russian feminine given names
 Persian feminine given names